USS Smith may refer to one of these United States Navy ships

See also 
 
 
 
 

United States Navy ship names